The 2016–17 Olympique Lyonnais Féminin season was the club's thirteenth season since FC Lyon joined OL as its women's section. Like the previous season, the team won all three competitions: the Division 1 Féminine, the Coupe de France Féminine and notably its fourth UEFA Women's Champions League after it defeated Paris Saint-Germain in the final.

Season events
Olympique Lyonnais had won in the 2015–16 season its second triple crown, including its fourth UEFA Women's Champions League along with its fifth national double in a row. Before the end of the season Amandine Henry had moved to the NWSL, while subsequently Louisa Necib retired and Lotta Schelin returned to the Damallsvenskan. Olympique reacted by signing Dzsenifer Marozsán from Frankfurt and Kenza Dali, Kheira Hamraoui, Jessica Houara and Caroline Seger from major rival Paris Saint-Germain.

On 1 September, Olympique Lyonnais announced the signing of Erin Nayler from Sky Blue to a two-year contract.

From September to November Olympique won all first eight league games and first two Champions League rounds against newcomer Avaldsnes and Zürich by wide scorelines. Following a 2–1 win over 3rd place Montpellier, Olympique ended the year a 1–0 loss in its first game against Paris Saint-Germain, which took the lead in the table. However, on January 6 PSG's September 0–4 win over Albi was reversed to a 3–0 loss, thus losing their advantage over Olympique. PSG's subsequent 2–1 loss against Montpellier gave Olympique the lead.

In the winter transfer window Olympique made three signings. Alex Morgan was recruited on loan from NWSL's Orlando Pride, and Kadeisha Buchanan and Josephine Henning subsequently joined the team, which won all its first games in 2017, expanding its lead to a 6-point margin, before facing Wolfsburg in the Champions League's quarterfinals. 2012–13 and 2013–14 champion Wolfsburg had been Olympique's rival in the past edition's final, which Olympique had won on penalties, and the tie was branded by the media as the competition's advanced final. Olympique nearly ensured qualification with a 0–2 away win, and made it to the semifinals against Manchester City despite a 0–1 home defeat. After qualifying for the national cup's final, Olympique again set course to the final in an away first leg with a 1–3 win before suffering a one-goal defeat in Lyon to a goal by Carli Lloyd, enough to make it to the final in Cardiff, where they faced Paris Saint-Germain in the second final between two teams from the same country.

On May 8 Olympique sealed its 11th national championship in a row with two games remaining, in a 9–0 win over Soyaux. Finally the team faced a triple showdown against Paris Saint-Germain with two titles in dispute as well as PSG's qualification for the next Champions League as Montpellier took the second place. After a 3–0 win in the league match, the cup final ended in a 1–1 draw followed by a 7–6 victory in the penalty shootout, giving Olympique its sixth consecutive national double. The Champions League final also ended in a draw with no goals were scored either in the extra time. The penalty shootout was also a long one, and it was resolved in a duel between the two goalkeepers. PSG's Katarzyna Kiedrzynek missed her kick and couldn't stop Sarah Bouhaddi's shot, which made the team the European champion for the fourth time.

Squad

Out on loan

Transfers

In

Loans in

Out

Loans out

Released

Friendlies

Competitions

Overview

Division 1

Results summary

Results by matchday

Results

Table

Coupe de France

UEFA Champions League

Final

Squad statistics

Appearances 

|-
|colspan="14"|Players away from the club on loan:

|-
|colspan="14"|Players who appeared for Olympique Lyonnais but left during the season:
|}

Goal scorers

Clean sheets

Disciplinary record

References 

Olympique Lyonnais
Olympique Lyonnais Féminin